The King House is a historic house at 328 Brookline Street in Newton, Massachusetts.  This -story timber-frame house was built around 1710, probably by Jonathan Dyke, a cooper, and is one of Newton's few First Period houses, dating to the early period of its settlement.  The house was given Greek Revival styling in the 19th century, and is also notable for its association with Noah King, a long-time prominent local doctor.  It is five bays wide, with a side gable roof, twin interior chimneys, and clapboard siding.  The main entrance has a Greek Revival surround with sidelight windows, wide pilasters, and an entablature. There is a "1695" dated plaque on the house which is the traditional/rumored date.

The house was listed on the National Register of Historic Places in 1986.

See also
 National Register of Historic Places listings in Newton, Massachusetts

References

Houses on the National Register of Historic Places in Newton, Massachusetts
Georgian architecture in Massachusetts
Houses completed in 1710
1710 establishments in Massachusetts